Text Records is a British independent record label founded by Kieran Hebden in 2001. Hebden has released much of his own music through the label: several albums and singles as Four Tet (including collaborations with Burial and Thom Yorke) and two albums with the band Fridge. Other artists to have released recordings on the label include Daphni, Koushik and One Little Plane.

Catalogue
Source

References

British independent record labels
Record labels established in 2001